The 1943–44 Allsvenskan was the tenth season of the top division of Swedish handball. 10 teams competed in the league. Majornas IK won the league, but the title of Swedish Champions was awarded to the winner of Svenska mästerskapet. Sanna IF and Göteborgs BoIS were relegated.

League table

Attendance

References 

Swedish handball competitions